Motahar Hossain Talukder (1922–2 December 2001), also known as Motahar Master, was a politician from Sirajganj District of Bangladesh. He was posthumously awarded the Ekushey Padak in 2021 by the Government of Bangladesh for his significant contribution to the Bengali language movement.

Early life 
Talukdar was born in 1922 in Gazaria in Ratankandi Union, Sirajganj. His father Naimuddin Talukder was a teacher. He completed higher secondary from Pabna Edward College and completed BSc from Rajshahi College.

Career 

Talukder was the former governor of Sirajganj District during the BAKSAL period. He was defeated in the Sirajganj-2 constituency as a candidate of Awami League in the fifth parliamentary elections of 1991.

Talukdar wrote an essay titled "55 years of my political life".

Death 
Talukder died on 2 December 2001 in Sirajganj.

References 

 

People of the Bangladesh Liberation War
Rajshahi College alumni
Awami League politicians
2001 deaths
1922 births
People from Sirajganj District
Recipients of the Ekushey Padak
Pabna Edward College alumni